Amata monothyris is a moth of the family Erebidae. It was described by George Hampson in 1914. It is found in Uganda.

References

 

Endemic fauna of Uganda
monothyris
Moths described in 1914
Moths of Africa